This is a list of Hopewell sites. The Hopewell tradition (also called the "Hopewell culture") refers to the common aspects of the Native American culture that flourished along rivers in the northeastern and midwestern United States from 200 BCE to 500 CE. The Hopewell tradition was not a single culture or society, but a widely dispersed set of related populations that were connected by a common network of trade routes, known as the Hopewell Exchange System.

See also
 National Register of Historic Places listings in Ross County, Ohio
 National Register of Historic Places listings in Warren County, Ohio

References

External links

+Sites
Hopewell sites
+Hopewell
Hopewell
Hopewell sites
Hopewell
+Hopewell
Hopewell
Native American-related lists